Japanese people in Hong Kong consist primarily of expatriate business people and their families, along with a smaller number of single women. Their numbers are smaller when compared to the sizeable presence of American, British, and Canadian expatriates. , 21,518 Japanese people had registered as residents of Hong Kong with the Japanese consulate there. Hong Kong also remains a popular destination for Japanese tourists on their way to Mainland China; in 2004, the Japanese consulate reported the arrival of more than one million Japanese tourists.

History

Origins

Japanese migration to Hong Kong was noted as early as the latter years of the Tokugawa shogunate. With the forced end of the sakoku policy, which prohibited Japanese people from leaving Japan, regular ship services began between Japan, Hong Kong and Shanghai; Japanese merchants and karayuki slowly began to settle overseas. By 1880, 26 men and 60 women of Japanese nationality were recorded as living in Hong Kong; the total population would reach 200 by the end of the Meiji era in 1912. To the displeasure of the Japanese government, which was concerned with protecting its image overseas, many of these early migrants were prostitutes called Karayuki-san. The early ones were often stowaways on coal ships from Nagasaki.

By 1885, Japanese consul Minami Sadatsuke, had obtained some level of informal co-operation from the British colonial authorities in suppressing Japanese participation in prostitution: the number of Japanese women granted prostitution licences would be limited to fifty-two, and others who applied for licences would be referred to his office, whereupon he would arrange for their repatriation to Japan or have them confined to the lock hospital in Wan Chai. Later, their geographical origins seemed to have shifted; a 1902 report by Japanese consul Noma Seiichi identified Moji in Kyushu as the most common port of origin for these young women; recruiters often targeted young women coming out of the Mojikō Station near the docks. However, the Japanese consulate had little co-operation from the local Japanese community in their efforts to suppress prostitution; Japanese businesspeople in the hospitality industry depended on custom from prostitutes and their johns for its profits.

Anti-Japanese riots of 1931
Following the Japanese invasion of Manchuria, tensions between Japanese and ethnic Chinese residents in Hong Kong began to grow. The first report of the invasion in the Hong Kong Chinese-language press appeared in the Kung Sheung Evening News on 20 September 1931, condemning it in harsh terms and calling on Chinese people to "stand up and take action". The Kuomintang government in Nanking declared 23 September 1931 as a day of mourning for the Mukden Incident; that evening, a disturbance arose on Johnston Road in Wan Chai, where many Japanese lived, when some Chinese youths began throwing stones at a Japanese-owned pub, ironically patronised mostly by American and British sailors at the time. The next day, a Japanese flag flying in a Japanese school in Kennedy Town was burned; attacks on individual Japanese continued on the 25th.

The worst crime of the riots was the murder of a Japanese family. On 26 September, the date of the Mid-Autumn Festival, five members of the Yamashita family were attacked near Kowloon City in front of more than one thousand Chinese demonstrators by a Chinese man; the parents died on the scene due to knife wounds, while the grandmother and two of three sons later died in hospital. As a result of the murders, the colonial government called out the military that evening, and proclaimed a state of emergency the next day. Tokyo would later cite these riots, and specifically the murders of the Yamashita family, as one casus belli when they initiated the Shanghai War of 1932 (a.k.a. 28 January Incident).

The Imperial Japanese Occupation and Japanese civilians
The Japanese population did not grow much in the following decade; though Japanese schools continued to operate in Wan Chai and Kennedy Town, by the time of the Japanese declaration of war against the British Empire and the start of the Battle of Hong Kong, the Japanese population of Hong Kong had dropped to 80. Japanese settlers often followed the Imperial Japanese Army, as in the case of Manchukuo in the aftermath of the Mukden Incident; however the 1941–1945 Japanese occupation of Hong Kong was not accompanied by an influx of Japanese civilians, with the exception of a few bureaucrats and administrators.

The existing institutions of the Japanese civilian population in Hong Kong were co-opted by the military for their own purposes; for example, the Hong Kong News, a Japanese language newspaper, ceased publication in Japanese, but continued operations in Chinese and English versions, printing officially-approved news of the occupation government. However, the Japanese civilians who remained in Hong Kong were not entirely unsympathetic to the plight of their Chinese neighbours; Patrick Yu, a celebrated trial lawyer, recalled in his memoirs the assistance his family received from the headmaster of the Japanese school in escaping from Hong Kong to Free China by way of Macau and Guangzhou Wan (then Portuguese and French colonies, respectively, and untouched by the Japanese military).

Post-World War II

As the Japanese economy recovered from the effects of World War II and began its boom, Japanese investment overseas grew, resulting in an increase in the Japanese population living in Hong Kong. The Hong Kong Japanese School, an international school aimed at Japanese students, was established in the 1960s; there is also a weekly print newspaper, the Hong Kong Post, which began publication in June 1987. Between 1981 and 1999, the population of Japanese in Hong Kong nearly tripled from 7,802 to 23,480, making the Japanese community similar in size to those in cities such as London and New York; in line with this increase, the number of Japanese companies also grew rapidly, almost doubling from 1,088 to 2,197 from 1988 to 1994.

The reform and opening up of China and the return of Hong Kong to Chinese sovereignty in 1997 spurred increasing economic integration with the mainland, and, following this trend, many Japanese-managed companies moved their operations across the border into Shenzhen and Guangzhou; as a result, the Japanese population of Hong Kong declined from its 1999 peak; the Hong Kong Census and Statistics Department recorded only 14,100 Japanese people in 2001, a 33% decrease. However, the population would soon bounce back; in 2004, the Japanese Consulate General estimated 25,600 Japanese living in Hong Kong.

The Eastern District has the highest concentration of Japanese residents of any district in Hong Kong, with 0.64% of its residents being of Japanese descent (2,878 people).

Attitude towards integration
Japanese communities abroad have been described as "Japanese villages abroad ... whose residents make maintenance of cultural, economic, and political ties with Tokyo their foremost concern"; however, Wong's 2001 study of Yaohan employees refuted this notion in the case of businesswomen working in Hong Kong. Though the majority of Japanese coming to Hong Kong continued to be businessmen and their families, during the 1990s, there was a "boom" of single Japanese women emigrating to escape the male-oriented environment of Japanese domestic workplaces; unlike previous migration, which had often been targeted towards Anglophone countries, many of these women went to Hong Kong and other Asian cities in an effort to further their careers. Notably, in one survey, a third of the single or divorced women coming to Hong Kong during this period reported previous study abroad experience. Not only were single women more willing to emigrate, but Japanese companies in Hong Kong proved more willing to hire and promote women than those in Japan, partially due to the costs of employing male staff, which typically included allowances for children's education and other such expatriate benefits.

Within Japanese-managed companies, local Chinese employees sensed a definite power differential between Japanese managers and local managers of the same rank. Though many Japanese women came to Hong Kong intending to learn to speak Chinese (either Cantonese or Mandarin), upon arrival they found that communicating in English was not only sufficient for everyday life, but placed them in a privileged position vis-a-vis the local population. Among respondents to the 2011 Census who self-identified as Japanese, 77.4% stated that they spoke Japanese as their usual language, 17.2% English, 3.9% Cantonese, and 1.0% Mandarin. With regards to additional spoken languages other than their usual language, 64.3% stated that they spoke English, 18.7% Cantonese, 18.7% Mandarin, and 19.5% Japanese. (Multiple responses were permitted to the latter question, hence the responses are non-exclusive and the sum is greater than 100%.) 4.1% did not speak Japanese as either their usual language nor an additional language, while the respective figures for English, Cantonese, and Mandarin were 18.4%, 77.4%, and 81.3%.

Education

The Hong Kong Japanese School, an international Japanese school, serves the city's Japanese population.

The  is a supplementary programme for Japanese children in Hong Kong.

The first Japanese primary school, operated by the Japanese Club, opened in a campus on Kennedy Road in 1911. At the time most Japanese expatriates did not bring their families and there were fewer than 100 Japanese children at any one time, so the school had a relatively low enrollment.

Media
The Hong Kong Post is the Japanese-language newspaper of Hong Kong.

Recreation
There is a social club for Japanese people in Hong Kong, The Hongkong Japanese Club, which has its building in Causeway Bay. In 1996 there were 4,228 Japanese members. It increased the number of non-Japanese members to 276 by 2002; as of that year within the membership the Japanese numbered 2,715. The number of non-Japanese members declined as the Japanese community was less wealthy than before, and because more and more Japanese involved in business in Guangdong Province lived in Shenzhen instead of Hong Kong.  the membership flat fee for Japanese was HK$200–400, and the deposit was $1,000, while the fee for non-Japanese was $9,500. The monthly rates for membership were $150–280 for Japanese and $340 for non-Japanese.

A group of Japanese business executives established the Japanese Club in 1905, and its clubhouse in Central opened in 1906. It became the centre of Hong Kong's Japanese community since the Japanese consulate lacked proper funds and staff to take that role. It became known as the Japanese Association in 1921.

Notable individuals
Scott MacKenzie, darts player, born in Brazil to mixed Japanese and Scottish parentage. Moved to the UK aged 6, then to Hong Kong in 1996, which he represents at a professional international level.
Shinichi Chan, born in Tokyo to mixed Japanese and Hongkongese parentage, member of Hong Kong National Football Team

References

Citations

Sources 

 
 
 
 
 
 
 
 
 ; only abstract freely available

Further reading

External links

  Hong Kong Post, a Japanese-language newspaper
  Hong Kong Japanese School , an international school for Japanese students
 

Hong Kong society
 
Hong Kong–Japan relations
Asian diaspora in Hong Kong
 
Japanese diaspora by city
Japanese diaspora in Asia